Abell 39 is a low surface brightness planetary nebula in the constellation of Hercules. It is the 39th entry in George Abell's 1966 Abell Catalog of Planetary Nebulae (and 27th in his 1955 catalog) of 86 old planetary nebulae which either Abell or Albert George Wilson discovered before August 1955 as part of the National Geographic Society - Palomar Observatory Sky Survey. It is estimated to be about 3,300 light-years from earth and 4,600 light-years above the Galactic plane. It is almost perfectly spherical and also one of the largest known spheres with a radius of about 1.3 light-years.

Central star
Its central star is slightly west of center by about 2 or 0.1 light-years. This offset does not appear to be due to interaction with the interstellar medium, but instead, it is hypothesized that a small asymmetric
mass ejection has accelerated the central star.

This planetary nebula has a nearly uniform spherical shell. However, the eastern limb of the nebula is 50% more luminous than the western limb. Additionally, irregularities in the surface brightness are seen across the face of the shell. The source of the east–west asymmetry is not known but it could be related to the offset of the central star.

The central star is classified as a subdwarf O star with surface temperature of 8869K.

Structure and composition
The bright rim of the planetary nebula has an average thickness of about 10.1 or about 0.34 light-years. There is a faint halo that extends about 18 beyond the bright rim giving a complete diameter of around 190 under the assumption that this emission is uniform around the planetary nebula.

This planetary nebula has been expanding for an estimated 22,100 years, based on an assumed expansion velocity between 32 and 37 km/s and a 0.4 parsec radius.

Background galaxies are visible near the nebula, and some can be seen through the translucent nebula.

Oxygen is only about half as abundant in the nebula as it is in our own sun.

Notes

References

External links 

George Jacoby et al. created a spectacular image of Abell 39 in 1997. 

Planetary nebulae
Hercules (constellation)
39